Dawson William Buckley (1917-1993) was an Australian rugby league footballer who played in the 1930s and 1940s.

Playing career

Buckley was a dual premiership winning player with Balmain Tigers. He played with Balmain for ten seasons from 1938-1947. 

He played prop forward in the winning Balmain teams of 1939 and played lock in the 1944 Grand Final. The war curtailed the back end of his career from 1945-1946, as he was not discharged from the Australian Army until the end of 1946. He couldn't get back into the first grade team in 1947, and retired at the end of the year. 

Buckley represented N.S.W. City Firsts on one occasions in 1942.

Buckley died on 27 June 1993, aged 76 at his Leichhardt, New South Wales home.

References

1917 births
1993 deaths
Balmain Tigers players
Australian Army personnel of World War II
Australian rugby league players
Rugby league props
Rugby league locks
Place of birth missing
City New South Wales rugby league team players
Rugby league players from Sydney